Woman to Woman (1983) was an American nationally-syndicated female-oriented television talk show. 

Hosted by Pat Mitchell, from Hour Magazine, Woman to Woman featured one topic each day. It was recorded in front of an all-female audience.

A unique feature of the show's syndication was the fact that it was available to stations in both an hour- and half-hour-long format.

Critic John J. O'Connor called the series "certainly a step in the right direction for daytime commercial television", and said, "Much of this is, by now, hardly earth-shattering in terms of being new, but it is being handled with intelligence." In 1984 it won the Daytime Emmy Award for Outstanding Talk Show.

References

External links
Woman to Woman Videotapes, 1983-1984. Schlesinger Library, Radcliffe Institute, Harvard University.

1983 American television series debuts
1984 American television series endings
1980s American television talk shows
First-run syndicated television programs in the United States
History of women in the United States